Curd or is a dairy product obtained by curdling milk.

Curd may also refer to:


Food
 Bean curd, a product derived from soyabeans
 Cheese curd, a type of particulate cheese
 Curd cheese, a type of soft fresh cheese
 Curd snack, a type of sweet snack made from curd cheese
 Curd (India), homemade yogurt of the Indian subcontinent
 Curd rice, a dish from India using unsweetened homemade yogurt
 Fruit curd, a type of dessert spread made of fruit
 Pig blood curd, a coagulated pig's blood food product
 The head of a Cauliflower

People
 Blake Curd (born 1967), U.S. politician from South Dakota
 Curd Duca (born 1955), Austrian musician
 Curd Jürgens (1915–1982), German-Austrian stage and film actor

Other uses
 Curd fruit, a fruit

See also 
 Curdled (film)
 Curdling
 Curds and whey (disambiguation)
 Kurd (disambiguation)